Smoking in Albania is prevalent as about 40% of Albanians smoke regularly. In Europe, only Turkey has a higher smoking rate than Albania. 
Albanians annually spend more than €300 million on tobacco products. Zog I of Albania was reported to smoke 200 cigarettes a day.  Albania adopted tough anti-smoking laws in 2007, but they are not strictly enforced. Smoking prevalence is increasing, especially among females ages 13 to 15. The smoking rate for teens between the ages of 13 and 15 is currently 15%.

Although the law technically forbids the smoking of cigarettes in public spaces like restaurants, bars, work places, etc., Albanians regularly smoke in those places, especially nights and weekends.  The smoking ban is generally followed on public transport in Tirana as people put out cigarettes before boarding buses.

References

Health in Albania
Politics of Albania
Albania